Jalan Bukit Larut, or Maxwell Hill Road, Federal Route 315, is a federal road in Perak, Malaysia. The road connects Taiping Lake Gardens in Taiping until Bukit Larut (Maxwell Hill) summit. The access road from Hutan Lipur Kaki Bukit Larut to Bukit Larut is available only by (government-owned) resort authority's Land Rovers (private vehicles are not allowed without a permit) although people are free to walk up the hill as many do for exercise (reaching the peak can take up to 3–5 hours). The journey, 13 kilometres from the base to the top of Bukit Larut using Land Rovers, takes around 30 minutes.

The Kilometre Zero is located at Jalan Taman Tasik junctions.

Taiping War Cemetery is located near the road.

At most sections, the Federal Route 315 was built under the JKR R5 road standard, allowing maximum speed limit of up to 90 km/h.

List of junctions and town 
The entire route is located within the district of Larut, Matang dan Selama, Perak. All junctions listed are at-grade intersections unless stated otherwise.

References

Malaysian Federal Roads